Desmiphora is a genus of longhorn beetles of the subfamily Lamiinae, containing the following species:

subgenus Antenniphora
 Desmiphora antennalis Breuning, 1947
 Desmiphora endibauna Galileo & Martins, 1998
 Desmiphora magnifica Martins & Galileo, 1995

subgenus Desmiphora
 Desmiphora aegrota Bates, 1880
 Desmiphora amioca Galileo & Martins, 1998
 Desmiphora apicata (Thomson, 1868)
 Desmiphora astrigae Tavakilian & Néouze, 2004
 Desmiphora auatinga Martins & Galileo, 1996
 Desmiphora barbata Martins & Galileo, 2005
 Desmiphora bijuba Giesbert, 1998
 Desmiphora boliviana Breuning, 1948
 Desmiphora canescens Bates, 1874
 Desmiphora cayennensis Tavakilian & Néouze, 2004
 Desmiphora chemsaki Giesbert, 1998
 Desmiphora circumspecta (Lane, 1973)
 Desmiphora cirrosa Erichson, 1847
 Desmiphora compacta Breuning, 1942
 Desmiphora compta Martins & Galileo, 2005
 Desmiphora crinita Giesbert, 1998
 Desmiphora crocata Melzer, 1935
 Desmiphora cucullata Thomson, 1868
 Desmiphora decora (Melzer, 1928)
 Desmiphora digna Giesbert, 1998
 Desmiphora dozieri Galileo & Martins, 2007
 Desmiphora durantoni Tavakilian & Néouze, 2004
 Desmiphora elegantula White, 1855
 Desmiphora fasciculata (Olivier, 1792)
 Desmiphora fasciola Martins & Galileo, 1995
 Desmiphora ferruginea (Thomson, 1868)
 Desmiphora flavescens Breuning, 1943
 Desmiphora fuscosignata Breuning, 1942
 Desmiphora hirticollis (Olivier, 1795)
 Desmiphora intonsa (Germar, 1824)
 Desmiphora jullienae Tavakilian & Néouze, 2004
 Desmiphora kawensis Tavakilian & Néouze, 2004
 Desmiphora lanuginosa Breuning, 1942
 Desmiphora lateralis Thomson, 1868
 Desmiphora laterialba Breuning, 1942
 Desmiphora lenkoi (Lane, 1959)
 Desmiphora lineatipennis Breuning, 1943
 Desmiphora longipilis (Fisher, 1926)
 Desmiphora maculosa Linsley & Chemsak, 1966
 Desmiphora mirim Martins & Galileo, 2002
 Desmiphora mulsa Giesbert, 1998
 Desmiphora multicristata Bates, 1866
 Desmiphora neoflavescens Galileo & Martins, 1998
 Desmiphora nigroannulata Martins & Galileo, 2002
 Desmiphora niveocincta (Lane, 1959)
 Desmiphora obliquelineata Breuning, 1948
 Desmiphora ornata Bates, 1866
 Desmiphora pallida Bates, 1874
 Desmiphora picta Breuning, 1943
 Desmiphora pitanga Galileo & Martins, 1998
 Desmiphora pretiosa Melzer, 1935
 Desmiphora rufocristata Melzer, 1935
 Desmiphora santossilvai Galileo & Martins, 2003
 Desmiphora sarryi Tavakilian & Néouze, 2004
 Desmiphora scapularis Bates, 1885
 Desmiphora senicula Bates, 1866
 Desmiphora spitzi Melzer, 1935
 Desmiphora tigrinata Martins & Galileo, 2002
 Desmiphora travassosi Mendes, 1938
 Desmiphora tristis Galileo & Martins, 2003
 Desmiphora undulatofasciata Breuning, 1942
 Desmiphora unicolor Breuning, 1961
 Desmiphora uniformis Galileo & Martins, 2003
 Desmiphora variola Giesbert, 1998
 Desmiphora venosa Bates, 1866
 Desmiphora x-signata Melzer, 1935
 Desmiphora xerophila Martins & Galileo, 1995

References

 
Desmiphorini